National Congenital Heart Disease Audit (NCHDA) (formerly called the Central Cardiac Audit Database) is a database established in 2000 for quality assurance purposes, to monitor the outcome for an individual who has undergone cardiac treatment. It comprises six national heart disease audits. Each audit enables health professionals to continually measure and improve care by comparing their work to specific standards and national trend. These audits from 2011 are part of the National Institute for Cardiovascular Outcomes Research formerly at University College London and in April 2015 moved to St. Bartholomew's Hospital.

Audits 
The following audits are available within the CCAD:

 Adult cardiac interventions
 Cardiac rhythm management
 Adult cardiac surgery
 Congenital heart disease
 Heart failure
 Myocardial infarction (MINAP)

References

External links
 

National Health Service
Medical databases